Amphionycha may refer to:
 Amphionycha Dejean, 1835, a genus of beetles in the family Cerambycidae, synonym of Adesmus
 Amphionycha Leséleuc, 1844, a genus of beetles in the family Cerambycidae, synonym of Quatiara
 Amphionycha LeConte, 1852, a genus of beetles in the family Cerambycidae, synonym of Hemierana